Cherry Grove is an unincorporated community in southwestern Caswell County, North Carolina, United States, east of Camp Springs, and west of Milesville.

External links
 Cherry Grove at the U.S. Geographic Names Information System

Unincorporated communities in Caswell County, North Carolina
Unincorporated communities in North Carolina